The DEL, 2nd Bundesliga and Oberliga are the first three levels of ice hockey in Germany. All three leagues operate nationwide. While the DEL is an independently operated league, the other two are run by the German ice hockey federation, the DEB, through the ESBG. The leagues below the Oberliga are operated by the state federations (German:Landesverbände) and don't run nationwide. The 2007–08 season for the three top leagues started on 6 September 2007 with the first round in the DEL and finished on 25 April 2008 with the fifth and last game of the 2nd Bundesliga finals.

Champions
 DEL: Eisbären Berlin
 2nd Bundesliga: Kassel Huskies
 Oberliga: Dresdner Eislöwen

Deutsche Eishockey Liga, the DEL
For main article, see Deutsche Eishockey Liga

The DEL is the highest tier of German ice hockey. The league was played with 15 clubs in the 2007–08 season, one more than the previous season, because the 2006–07 2nd Bundesliga champion EHC Wolfsburg Grizzly Adams had joined the league. The modus however remained the same. Each club played the others four times, resulting in 56 regular season games per club. The top six clubs at the end of the regular season qualified for the first round of the play-offs. The clubs seven to ten played a preliminary round to determine the last two places for the first round. For the teams placed eleven to fifteen, the season has ended. No club was relegated from the DEL this season. The league will however expand and admit a sixteenth team for next season.

The league was won, for a third time in four years, by the Eisbären Berlin.

Final table
The final table operates under the following points system: Three points for a win, two for a win after overtime or penalties, one for a loss after overtime or penalties and no points for an outright loss.

 Abbreviations: P = Games played, OTW = Overtime win, PW = Win after penalty shootout, OTL = Overtime loss, PL = Loss after penalty shoutout, GF = Goals for, GA = Goals against, (C) = Defending champion, (N) = New club
 Source:

Play-offs
The four rounds of the 2007–08 play-offs were played under the following system:
 Preliminary round: Best-of-three
 First round: Best-of-seven
 Semifinals: Best-of-five
 Finals: Best-of-five
Unlike the regular season, in the play-offs games will not be decided by penalty shoot-outs but in overtime (OT) sudden-death. In all play-off rounds the higher placed team from the regular season has home advantage in the uneven numbered games (Game 1, 3, 5, 7) and the other team in the even numbered games (Game 2, 4, 6).

Preliminary round

First round

Semi finals

Finals

Play-off tree

Top Scorers
The five highest placed scores in the regular season and play-offs are:

Regular season

Play-offs

2nd Bundesliga
For main article, see 2nd Bundesliga
The 2nd Bundesliga is the second highest tier of ice hockey in Germany. The league played with 14 clubs in the 2007–08 season, the same number it had since 2001. Each club played each other four times during the regular season. The top eight teams in the league qualified for the play-offs to determined the 2nd Bundesliga champion who also has the opportunity to gain promotion to the DEL this season. For the clubs placed nine and ten, the season has finished after the regular round. The bottom four clubs play out the two relegated teams from the 2nd Bundesliga. However, due to the later insolvency of two of the league's teams, only one club, the EV Landsberg, was relegated.

The league was won by the Kassel Huskies who thereby earned the right to apply for a DEL licence and return to the league they played in until 2006.

The Moskitos Essen and Eisbären Regensburg both declared insolvency on 15 April 2008, being unable to meet their debts. Both clubs are immediately relegated from the 2nd Bundesliga. The two relegated clubs, Lausitz and Landsberg, are the first replacement for the two. The EV Landsberg is in financial trouble themselves and will probably not take part in the next 2nd Bundesliga season, therefore the Wölfe Freiburg become the next replacement as best-placed semifinal loser from the Oberliga. Should Regensburg be able to survive the insolvency, the team could enter in the Oberliga for the 2008–09 season, this is however seen as unlikely by the club. If not it will take up the place of its reserve team in the Bavarian Landesliga (Tier V). Which league the Moskitos Essen will be playing in 2008–09 is not yet clear but it will not be the 2nd Bundesliga. Like Regensburg, the team could take the place of the reserve side which won promotion to the Regionalliga (Tier IV) this season.

Due to the structure of the 2nd Bundesliga, where all teams playing are separate companies operated by the mother club, the insolvency of one of those does not mean the club itself becomes insolvent. Reserve teams are usually operated by the mother club and therefore unaffected by any insolvencies.

Regular season
The final table operates under the following points system: Three points for a win, two for a win after overtime, one for a loss after overtime and no points for an outright loss.

 Abbreviations: P = Games played, OTW = Overtime win, OTL = Overtime loss, GF = Goals for, GA = Goals against, GD = Goal difference, (N) = New club

Play-offs
The three rounds of the 2007–08 play-offs were played under the following system:
 First round: Best-of-seven
 Semifinals: Best-of-five
 Finals: Best-of-five
In all play-off rounds the higher placed team from the regular season has home advantage in the uneven numbered games (Game 1, 3, 5, 7) and the other team in the even numbered games (Game 2, 4, 6). Should a game be undecided after regular time, there will be one overtime (OT) in sudden death format. Should there still be no winner, the game is decided through penalties (P).

First round

Semi finals

Finals

 The Kassel Huskies are the 2nd Bundesliga champions and gained the right to apply for a DEL licence.

Play-downs
The play downs consists of only one round, played in a best-of-seven format. The two loser of this round are nominally relegated to the Oberliga.

 The EV Landsberg and EHC Lausitzer Füchse are relegated. Due to the insolvency of Essen and Regensburg, the Lausitzer Füchse remain in the league. The EV Landsberg could also stay in the 2nd Bundesliga but was in financial trouble themselves and will play in the Oberliga next season.

Play-off tree

Oberliga
For main article, see Oberliga
The Oberliga is the third tier of ice hockey in Germany and as such the lowest nationwide level; below it are currently the LEV's (Landesverbände). In the 2007–08 season the league played with 19 clubs. For the first time since 2001, the Oberliga was split into a northern and a southern group. Unlike until 2001 however, when the top teams of the two divisions only met in the finals, games between the two groups are already staged in the regular season, when teams from the same division met each other four times while teams from opposite divisions only met twice.

The first four clubs in each group qualified for the Oberliga play-offs to determine the two promoted clubs to the 2nd Bundesliga. An Oberliga final is not played as the two semifinal winners are both promoted. The regular season results between the two semifinal winners determined the Oberliga champion instead. The two fifth-placed teams and the sixth from the south finished their season with the end of the regular season.  The bottom four clubs of each division played out one relegated team each, independently of each other. In turn, the three regional champions will gain promotion to the Oberliga with the possibility of more clubs moving up should the DEL, as planned, expand or a club in the top three divisions fold or withdraw.

The league was won by the Dresdner Eislöwen who are, together with the runner-up Tölzer Löwen, promoted to the 2nd Bundesliga. Due to Kassel gaining entry to the DEL, the Wölfe Freiburg were also promoted. Of the bottom two clubs, only Erfurt was relegated. Weiden withdrew from the league for financial reasons.

Regular season
The regular season saw the league split into two groups, the Oberliga Nord and Oberliga Süd, a separation which had existed until the 2000–01 season.

North

South

 Abbreviations: P = Games played, OTW = Overtime win, OTL = Overtime loss, GF = Goals for, GA = Goals against, GD = Goal difference, (R) Club relegated from the 2nd Bundesliga, (N) = New club

Play-offs
The Oberliga play-offs are operating on a best-of-seven modus. The winning teams of the semifinals are promoted to the 2nd Bundesliga. Should the DEL expand to 16 teams, the best placed club of the two semifinal losers will also gain entry to the 2nd Bundesliga.

First round

Semi finals
Winners promoted to 2nd Bundesliga.

 The Tölzer Löwen and Dresdner Eislöwen are both promoted to the 2nd Bundesliga. The Dresdner Eislöwen are the 2007–08 Oberliga champions.

Play-downs
The Oberliga play-downs are also operating on a best-of-seven modus. The two groups determine separately one relegated team each, this being the losing teams of the second round.

First round
 North

 South

Second round
Losing teams relegated to the LEV's.
 North

 South

 The Black Dragons Erfurt and EHF Passau Black Hawks  are relegated to the LEV's. Due to the insolvency of Essen and Regensburg in the 2nd Bundesliga, Passau will remain in the league.

Play-off tree

 * Finals not played, the Dresdner Eislöwen declared champions due to winning both regular season games versus Tölzer Löwen.

Leagues below the Oberliga
The levels below the Oberliga are not administrated by the DEB but rather by the local federations, the LEV's. With the ESBG's intention to increase the number of clubs in the Oberliga from 19 to 20 to balance both leagues, three promotion places will be available from the LEV's to this league in 2007–08. Should the DEL expand as well, another promotion spot would become available and it is planned to hand this one to the Regionalliga West. Only the three regional champions had the right for promotion but all clubs but the Herner EV declined:

 Regionalliga West: champions: Herner EV 2007, runners-up: EHC Dortmund
 Regionalliga Nordost: champions: EHV Schönheide, runners-up: ECC Preussen Juniors Berlin
 Bayernliga: champions: EHC Waldkraiburg, runners-up: EC Pfaffenhofen

Regionalliga West
The Regionalliga West is actually not quite a league but rather a promotion round. It contains the best six teams of the Regionalliga Nordrhein-Westfalen, and the top two teams of the Regionalliga Hessen and the Baden-Württemberg Liga each. The winner of this league is promoted to the Oberliga but this seasons runner-up, the EHC Dortmund may gain promotion to. As such, the league covers the German states of Baden-Württemberg, Hessen, Saarland, Rheinland-Pfalz and Nordrhein-Westfalen.

Regionalliga Nordost
This league covers the north and north east of Germany. Again, it is more of a promotion round, compromising ten teams from two groups, the northern and the north eastern group. The Regionalliga Nordost covers the German states of Niedersachsen, Bremen, Hamburg, Schleswig-Holstein, Mecklenburg-Vorpommern, Berlin, Sachsen-Anhalt, Sachsen and Thüringen.

Bayernliga
Main article see 2007–08 Bavarian ice hockey season
The Bayernliga is the only single-state league of the three, covering just Bavaria. The reason for this is that the state holds approximately one third of all ice hockey clubs in Germany and 18 of the 48 clubs in the first three divisions are from this federation.

 Source:

Sources
 Hockey Archives – International ice hockey website with tables and results (in French)
 Official website of the ESBG for the 2nd Bundesliga and Oberliga (in German)
 Official DEL website (in German)

References